Kevin Sandwith (born 30 April 1978) is an English retired professional footballer who played as a defender and midfielder for Northern Premier League Premier Division side Buxton.

He has previously played for Carlisle United, Telford United, Doncaster Rovers, Halifax Town, Lincoln City, Macclesfield Town, Chester City, Weymouth, Oxford United, Mansfield Town and Gainsborough Trinity.

Career
 Sandwith began his career as a Youth Trainee at Carlisle United and went on to sign professional terms with them, making his league debut in October 1997. However, after only three further appearances, he was released by the Cumbrians in May 1998 and joined non-league Barrow. He made 14 appearances for Barrow, scoring three times, before moving to join Telford United. Comfortable either at left-back or in midfield, Sandwith stayed at Telford until the summer of 2001 without every really fully establishling himself. He moved on to Doncaster Rovers but, after starting the season as the regular left-back, a broken foot kept him on the sidelines for three months and he found it hard to regain a regular starting position. In November 2002, he moved on to Halifax Town and cemented a regular starting berth. A series of impressive performances began to draw attention and, having scored against them in the Football League Trophy earlier in the season, Lincoln City paid £10,000 for his services in March 2004. He spent a season and a half at Sincil Bank before a move to Macclesfield Town where he spent a season before joining Chester City. His first Chester goal ironically came against Macclesfield in September 2006.

Ex-Chester manager Mark Wright was a big admirer of Sandwith, stating that he is "undoubtedly one of the best players in this league at delivering a ball with his left foot, from free-kicks and corners".

On 28 December 2007, it was announced Sandwith was no longer in the club's plans and was available for sale. However, he returned to the starting line-up against Notts County on 19 January 2008 and he regularly figured in the first–team in the closing months of the season, leading to him being offered a new contract at the end of the campaign. But he turned down the contract and left the club. Sandwith signed for Weymouth on 1 July 2008, before moving to Oxford United in February 2009. Sandwith joined Mansfield Town by signing a one-year deal on 28 May 2010 after his release from Oxford United. Sandwith was released on 31 May 2011.

After spending the pre-season training with Eastwood Town, Sandwith joined Gainsborough Trinity in August 2011, debuting in the club's 3–1 Conference North victory at home to Solihull Moors on 13 August 2011. Sandwith was not amongst those players retained at the end of the 2011–12 season and thus left the club.

In June 2012 he joined Worcester City on trial but opted not to sign a new deal because of the distance the city is from his home. On 17 July he joined Buxton. On 30 March 2013 Sandwith Played his last game for Buxton losing 3–2 to Hendesford at Keys Park. In September 2014 he played once for AFC Wulfrunians.

References

External links

Living people
1978 births
English footballers
Carlisle United F.C. players
Barrow A.F.C. players
Telford United F.C. players
Doncaster Rovers F.C. players
Halifax Town A.F.C. players
Lincoln City F.C. players
Macclesfield Town F.C. players
Chester City F.C. players
Weymouth F.C. players
Oxford United F.C. players
Mansfield Town F.C. players
Gainsborough Trinity F.C. players
Buxton F.C. players
A.F.C. Wulfrunians players
English Football League players
National League (English football) players
Association football fullbacks
Association football midfielders